Andrew Paul Gosden (born 10 July 1993) disappeared from Central London on 14 September 2007 when he was aged 14. On that day, Gosden left his home in Doncaster, South Yorkshire, withdrew £200 from his bank account and bought a one-way ticket to London from Doncaster station. He was last seen on CCTV leaving King's Cross station. Despite numerous national appeals for information in the years following his disappearance, Gosden's reason for travelling to London that day, and his subsequent fate, have not been established.

In December 2021, detectives investigating the case arrested two men on suspicion of kidnap and human trafficking in relation to Gosden's disappearance. Both men have been released under investigation while enquiries continue. They are believed to be the first arrests made in connection to Gosden's disappearance. In January 2023, police confirmed that the investigations were still ongoing.

Background

Home life 
The Gosden family live in Balby, a suburb of Doncaster, South Yorkshire. Andrew Gosden's parents are both committed Anglican Christians, but had not baptised their children, as they did not want to impose their views on them. Prior to his disappearance, Gosden had not been to church for eighteen months. He had been a Cub Scout, but a few months before his disappearance told his father that he would no longer involve himself with the group. Gosden's family described him as a "home bird" who rarely left the house and never without saying where he was going. Gosden was known to his family as 'Roo'.

School life 
Gosden was a gifted student with a 100% attendance record at The McAuley Catholic High School. He was on the Young Gifted and Talented Programme, which was designed to enhance the educational development of the top five percent of school pupils, and he had been expected to score straight As in his GCSE examinations. Gosden was described as a prize-winning mathematician who seemed destined for Cambridge. He was described as having a neutral attitude about school, hoping the upcoming school term would provide more of a challenge after having 'cruised' through his education thus far. Gosden tended to say little about his school life to his parents.

During the 2006 summer holidays Gosden attended a two-week residential school at Lancaster University as part of the Young Gifted and Talented Programme. The summer school was for children from all over the UK aged 11–16 who were in the top 5% academically. Gosden's parents recalled that he returned from the summer school enthused about what he had been doing there.

Gosden was described as being happy with his own company, but was not a loner as he had his own small group of like-minded friends. However, Gosden's family say that he did not socialise with his friends outside of school. Gosden exhibited no signs of depression and there were no indications that he had been subjected to bullying.

Description
Gosden was said by his father to be absent-minded, not streetwise, and potentially vulnerable. He was a 'deep character' who did not get worked up or moody. His teachers characterised him as a shy, quiet young man who was mature beyond his years.

Other sources have stated that although Gosden was aged 14 when he disappeared, he looked younger; perhaps about 12, as he was small for his age. Gosden wore strong prescription glasses, is deaf in his left ear, and has a distinctive double ridge on his right ear. Gosden had light brown hair but was planning to dye it black before he disappeared. 

Gosden owned a couple of mobile phones between the ages of ten and twelve but he rarely used them and subsequently lost them. He was given a new phone for his twelfth birthday, but also rarely used this and did not want to replace it when he lost it months before his disappearance. When his parents offered to replace the lost mobile phones he stated that he would prefer a new Xbox instead. 

Gosden was interested in video games and metal bands. He was last seen wearing a black Slipknot T-shirt, black jeans, trainers, a watch on his left wrist, and carrying a black canvas satchel with patches of rock and metal bands on it.

Events leading up to the disappearance 
During the 2007 school summer holidays (typically July to September), Gosden's parents had suggested that he travel alone to London to stay with his grandmother, but he chose not to go.

At the time of his disappearance, Gosden was eight days into the new school year after returning from the summer holidays. In the days leading up to his disappearance, Gosden twice chose to break his normal routine; his parents reported that he told them he walked home from school rather than taking the school bus. Walking the  route from school to his home would have taken around one hour and twenty minutes.

The evening before the day of the disappearance was described by Gosden's father as uneventful. The family ate together as usual, and they all washed the dishes afterwards. Gosden spent an hour making a jigsaw with his father. He then watched some comedy programmes on television, including Mock the Week and That Mitchell and Webb Look, with his mother.

Day of the disappearance
On the morning of his disappearance, Gosden had difficulty waking up and seemed particularly irritable. His mother has stated that this was unusual as he was normally awake on time. 

At 8:05 am Gosden left his house and was witnessed walking across the local park (Westfield) to his usual bus stop by family friend Rev. Alan Murray who was sitting on a bench in the park. Instead of taking the school bus, Gosden diverted from his usual route and walked to a cash machine at a local garage. Here he withdrew £200 from his bank account which was almost all of his money; he had £214 in the account, but the ATM would only allow withdrawals of £20 increments. Gosden was then captured on a neighbour's CCTV system returning home.

At home, Gosden placed his uniform in the washing machine and his blazer on the back of his chair. He then changed into casual clothes, consisting of a black Slipknot T-shirt and black jeans, and took a bag embellished with various patches of rock and metal bands. He also took his wallet, keys, and a PlayStation Portable console. No other possessions were identified as missing. It was quickly established that he had not taken his passport with him. Gosden's father stated that his son did not appear to have taken a sweatshirt or coat with him, and had also not taken the charger for his PSP. Gosden also left around £100 in cash that he had saved up from birthdays.

At 8:30 am, Gosden departed from the house and was seen heading down Littlemoor Lane, towards Westfield Park on a neighbour's CCTV. He then walked to Doncaster railway station and purchased a one-way ticket to London which cost £31.40. The ticket seller later recalled that she had told Gosden that a return ticket cost just 50p more but he insisted on purchasing a single ticket. 

At 9:35 am Gosden was seen boarding the train to King's Cross station alone. A woman reported sitting next to Gosden, whom she described as being quiet and engrossed in playing with his video game. When Gosden failed to attend morning lessons at his school his teachers tried to contact his parents. The school believed that they had called Gosden's parents and left a message informing them that he had not attended school. However, the school dialled the number of the parents either above or below Gosden in the register and the message was left on the wrong person's phone.

Gosden arrived at King's Cross station at 11:20 am. He was captured on CCTV leaving the main entrance of the station at 11:25 am. This was the last confirmed sighting of him.

Disappearance and initial investigation
That evening the Gosden family and a family friend sat down for dinner thinking that Gosden was either in the converted cellar playing video games or in his room doing homework. When the family discovered that he was not in the house, they initially thought he could be with a friend or a neighbour and had simply lost track of time. Gosden's parents telephoned his friends, who informed them that Gosden was not there and had not been at school that day. At around 7:00pm, the police were called. Gosden's sister, Charlotte, stated: "It was just a complete panic. We initially thought something must have happened on the way to school. When we found that he hadn't even been to school – even tried to go to school – that was even more worrying."

Charlotte and Gosden's father, Kevin, scouted Gosden's route to school and areas nearby, but found nothing. Within three hours of discovering Gosden's disappearance, a missing-person leaflet was produced for circulation. Gosden's family and friends searched the area until nightfall. That weekend, the police searched the bushes near the Gosdens' home in Doncaster, but found nothing.

Three days later, after speaking to the woman who had sold Gosden his train ticket, the police confirmed that he had travelled to London. The ticket seller at Doncaster station remembered Gosden because he had refused a return ticket, despite it only costing a small amount more than a single. Gosden's father later stated that the purchase of a single ticket rather than a return did not seem strange to him, as Gosden knew numerous people in London with whom he could have stayed. Initial searches in London focused on the Chislehurst and Sidcup areas, where the Gosden family have relatives.

Days after the disappearance, the family travelled to London and handed out flyers and posters in the vicinity of anywhere they felt Gosden would have had an interest in visiting, especially museums and exhibitions.

The South Yorkshire Police (SYP) said it asked British Transport Police (BTP) to search the CCTV footage within two days of Gosden going missing, but BTP could not pick him out from the crowds. Three weeks later, CCTV footage at King's Cross was again reviewed by BTP and SYP, who identified Gosden. The CCTV image of Gosden leaving the main concourse at King's Cross was circulated in the media accompanied by a close up of his right ear, which has a distinctive double ridge.

Subsequent investigations
The family and the police investigated the possibility that Gosden had gone to London to meet someone whom he had met over the Internet. However, there was no evidence for this. Gosden did not use a computer at home; his father stated that Gosden did not have an e-mail address and had not set up an online account on either his Xbox or his PSP. The police took the computers from Gosden's school and Doncaster Library but their digital forensic investigations found no trace of any activity by Gosden.  

Investigators sent the unique serial number of Gosden's PSP to Sony HQ who checked and found that there was no record of an account being set up or communication established on the device. The Sony PSP 1000 had a DNAS authentication system allowing Sony to see when a PSP had connected to the internet. The only PC in the house was his sister's laptop, which had only been in her possession for eight weeks. Gosden's sister has stated that he did not seem interested in social media or connecting with other people through the Internet as he "just didn't seem social".

A year after Gosden's disappearance, the head teacher at McAuley Catholic High School, Mary Lawrence, travelled to London with staff and pupils and distributed 15,000 leaflets.

Reason for travelling to London 
After the initial CCTV trail went cold, the investigation moved on to trying to establish why Gosden had decided to go to London. An early theory put forward by the family was that Gosden had decided to take in some of the sights. Gosden was known to have enjoyed London, and would visit the capital with his family to see his grandparents, aunts, uncles, and family friends who lived there. He also enjoyed visiting London's museums and exhibitions. According to Gosden's father, Gosden also had a good knowledge of how the public transport system worked, knew the layout, and was confident in navigating his way around the city. Travel on buses was free for children at the time of Gosden's disappearance.

One event identified by Kevin Gosden as a possible reason for his son to have travelled to London was the 2007 YouTube Gathering. However, there is no evidence that Gosden attended this event or had any interest in YouTube. The family also looked into music concerts that Gosden might have gone to London to attend. The night of his disappearance, Thirty Seconds to Mars played the Brixton Academy and SikTh played a rescheduled farewell show at the Carling Academy.

The venue is within walking distance from King's Cross. The SikTh gig was originally scheduled for 4:00 pm on 7 July and was to be the last show with the original vocalist, making it a unique event. Mick Neville, retired head of the Metropolitan Police's Central Images Unit, believed the SikTh theory to be plausible. He appealed for anyone with photos or videos taken at the gig to come forward so that "super recognisers" could scan the images. Neville went on to state: "There is a canal nearby (Regents Canal). It is unclear whether this was ever dredged or checked." Although Gosden was a fan of similar metal bands, there is no evidence that he attended these shows or that he even liked these bands.

Finnish band HIM did a promotional signing at the HMV store on Oxford Street on Monday 17 September 2007, and performed an invitation-only show the same evening at the Borderline venue in Soho. The only way to get into this show was by completing various contests and giveaways. This lead was investigated by the family with help from HIM, but it did not produce any meaningful leads. Gosden's father has also stated that he suspected that Gosden might have gone to London to do something for which he felt it was easier to seek forgiveness than ask permission.

Speaking in 2009, Kevin Gosden speculated on the reason for Andrew's disappearance: "Did he decide to do the Reginald Perrin thing, and reinvent himself? Or was there something troubling him that he felt he couldn't tell us? In my heart, I still think his disappearance was a spur-of-the-moment thing."

Criticism of the police investigation
Gosden's family were critical of the police's decision to concentrate on investigating the family rather than requesting CCTV footage beyond Kings Cross during the initial stages of the investigation. Kevin Gosden claimed that the police viewed him as a suspect during the initial stages and they carried out unlawfully recorded interviews aimed at pressuring him into revealing the reason for his son's disappearance. Kevin Gosden and the wider family were cleared of any involvement.

SYP asked the BTP to search the available CCTV footage within two days of Gosden being reported missing. However, the BTP could not locate Gosden in the crowds, so SYP sent an officer to London to assist with the search; after this, Gosden was spotted. However, the CCTV footage from buses and the adjacent tube station was not requested by the authorities. Furthermore, Kevin has claimed that the reported sightings of Gosden at a Pizza Hut and at Covent Garden were not followed up.

Possible sightings
An article in The Times written on the first anniversary of Gosden's disappearance reported that, at that time, 122 possible sightings had been reported from all over Britain, including 45 from London and 11 from Brighton. Gosden's father said there were two or three sightings within the first week of the disappearance that seemed credible, partly because of the way the witnesses claimed Gosden spoke to them. Gosden's family believe the most plausible sighting to be one which placed Gosden at the Pizza Hut on Oxford Street (2.6 miles (4 km), 1 hour's walk from Kings Cross) on the day he went missing.

There were additional unconfirmed sightings on Oxford Street on Monday 17 September, and the next day, when Gosden was said to have been sleeping in a park in Southwark. Gosden was reportedly seen getting off a local train from Waterloo at Mortlake station on 19 September 2007 (five days after he disappeared) then possibly walking up Sheen Lane and along Upper Richmond Road. On 19 September, it was reported that he appeared to have obtained warmer clothes. A woman reported a potential sighting of Gosden on 17 October (a month after he disappeared) in Covent Garden: she spoke to a boy and stated that he looked like a boy she had seen on TV that was missing, but the boy denied that he was Gosden.

Later, other reported sighting locations included a park in Streatham, then further afield in South Wales, Birkenhead and Plymouth. In 2009, two possible sightings were reported, one outside the Natural History Museum, the other in a pub in Southend. None of these sightings could be verified. However, according to Gosden's father, none of the sightings were followed up by the police, and the woman who reported the Covent Garden sighting was not spoken to until six weeks after the disappearance.

Subsequent events
In November 2008, a man visited Leominster police station in Herefordshire, West Midlands, and used the intercom system to talk to a police officer, stating that he had information about Gosden. As it was in the evening, the intercom system was in use rather than a staffed reception. By the time an officer arrived to take the details, the man had left. Police later appealed for him to get back in touch. Subsequently, an individual claiming to be the man at the police station wrote anonymously to the BBC after it featured the case on The One Show. He gave details of a possible sighting of Andrew Gosden in Shrewsbury in November 2008. It has not been confirmed that it was the same man on both occasions and if so, why he did not wait at the police station.

In September 2009, the family released age-progressed images of what Gosden might look like aged sixteen, to mark the second year of his disappearance. In November 2009, Kevin Gosden appealed to the gay community to help find his son. Gosden's family considered the possibility that Gosden could have been struggling with his sexual orientation (children who are gay or lesbian are much more likely to run away than those who are heterosexual).  Kevin Gosden said: "We are a pretty open family so have wondered if he was gay or struggling with his sexual identity and found it too awkward to raise. If he is gay, we do not have any issue with it, he is loved unconditionally by both my wife and I and his sister."

In May 2011, the family paid a private company to conduct a sonar search of the River Thames, using the same technology that is used to locate victims and objects at sea. No trace of Gosden was found during the search, though it did find another body.

In 2016, Gosden's parents appealed for information on the BBC's flagship current affairs television programme Panorama. The following year, to mark the tenth anniversary of his disappearance, the charity Missing People made Gosden the face of their 'Find Every Child' campaign, with Gosden featuring on billboards and advertisements throughout the UK.

On 12 September 2017, the police made a fresh appeal for information. A statement on the South Yorkshire Police Facebook page said police were, or had been, investigating requests for similar optical prescriptions to Gosden's, requesting documents from the Passport Office or National Insurance and circulating Gosden's DNA, fingerprints, and dental and health records. The tone of the statement suggested that the police believed Gosden may be still alive. The police undertake annual checks on John Does in hospital.

In June 2018, the Gosden family said that someone had reported an online conversation with a person with the user name 'Andy Roo' who claimed that their boyfriend had left them and they needed £200 to cover rent. When someone offered to send them money, the user claimed they did not have a bank account as they had "left home when they were 14". This link was investigated by police but the person was not identified. 

In July 2018, to mark Gosden's 25th birthday, two updated age progression photographs were released by the family. It was also announced that the band Muse would help publicise the campaign to find Gosden.

In October 2019, another age progression image of Gosden was released.

Gosden's family have kept his room as he left it and have not changed the locks on the house as Gosden was known to have taken his key. Gosden's bank account has not been used since he made the withdrawal on the morning of 14 September 2007.

December 2021 arrests 
On 11 January 2022, South Yorkshire Police said that on 8 December 2021, detectives had arrested two men, aged 38 and 45, on suspicion of kidnapping and human trafficking. The older man's arrest was also connected with possession of child pornography. Both men have been released under investigation while enquiries continue. They are believed to be the first arrests made in connection to the disappearance. The following day, it was announced that numerous devices had been seized from the men for forensic investigation, which police said could take six months to a year. Kevin Gosden thanked the public for their support and said the family did not know any more than what had been released in the police statement. 

In January 2023, South Yorkshire Police said that the men remained under investigation, and that the subsequent devices were also still under examination.

Media 
Gosden's disappearance has featured in several media broadcasts and publications:
 Two years after his disappearance, in 2009, Gosden's case was examined in an episode of the Sky TV documentary Missing Children: Lorraine Kelly Investigates. 

 An episode of the BBC programme Missing (previously known as Missing Live) that discussed Andrew Gosden's case was aired in 2011. It included comments from police officers who investigated the case.

 An episode of BBC Panorama, titled Britain's Missing Young People, aired in July 2016 featuring interviews with Gosden's parents and the vicar who saw Gosden on the day of his disappearance. 

 The talk show Loose Women aired an episode in late 2018 concerning Gosden's disappearance.

 An episode of the BBC podcast The Next Episode that was released on BBC Sounds in September 2019 discussed the events and featured an interview with Gosden's father Kevin.

 An episode of BBC Crimewatch Live  (Roadshow Live Episode 18 – Series 11) was aired in March 2020. It featured both Gosden's father Kevin and an appeal for information about Andrew by  South Yorkshire Police.

See also

 List of people who disappeared
 Disappearance of Alex Sloley, 16-year-old gifted maths student who disappeared from Central London – 10 months after Gosden.

. The last confirmed sighting of Allen was also at King's Cross station.
Murder of Lindsay Rimer – Unsolved 1994 case of a 13-year-old British girl who disappeared from the street in Yorkshire, only to be found dead one year later in a nearby canal

Footnotes

References

External links
 Missing People listing for Andrew Gosden
 ICMEC Global Missing Children listing for Andrew Gosden
 Interpol listing for Andrew Gosden
 Official Website: Help Us To Find Andrew
 Official Facebook page
 BBC report on Andrew Gosden – missing ten years

2007 in London
2000s missing person cases
Missing person cases in London
September 2007 events in the United Kingdom